The 1966 New South Wales Rugby Football League premiership was the 59th season of the rugby league competition based in Sydney. Ten clubs from across the city competed for the J.J. Giltinan Shield and the WD & HO Wills Cup during the season, which culminated in a replay of the 1964 grand final between St. George and Balmain.

Season summary
1966 was the last season played under the unlimited tackle rule. Balmain, with their talented raw rookie recruit Arthur Beetson, appeared to be about to topple the Dragons from their long-held perch when the Tigers won eleven consecutive regular season games. However a late season slump saw them pegged back to the rest of the field and an eventual second place on the minor-premiership ladder behind the Dragons, who were being led by new captain-coach Ian Walsh.

Eastern Suburbs did not win a single match in 1966, continuing a losing streak that started in round 14, 1965 and which would run till round 2, 1967. This marked the second-most consecutive losses in NSWRFL premiership history at 25 behind University’s 42 in the middle 1930s. Their winless streak ran a total of 29 games between their 11–9 win over Canterbury in Round 12, 1965 and beating North Sydney 17–11 in Round 6 of 1967.

No team would finish a season on zero points again until the Melbourne Storm finished last in the 2010 season as punishment for gross salary cap breaches uncovered by the NRL in April that year.

Teams

Ladder

Finals

Grand Final

Balmain had beaten St. George twice in the regular season and in their coach Harry Bath, who had helped design the Dragons premiership winning formula, had a tactician well placed to counter it. They had a number of young players in Beetson, Kevin Yow Yeh and Denis Tutty who could trouble the Dragons, plus the experience of Dave Bolton, Peter Provan and the unrivalled goal-kicking brilliance of Keith Barnes.

The opening skirmishes on the day of the decider were balanced. Balmain took an early lead when Barnes kicked a penalty goal. St. George's Billy Smith struck back when he set up a run around movement with Brian Clay, which led to a try to Bruce Pollard.

The turning point of the match came soon after when the Dragons' English import Dick Huddart and Ian Walsh put on a set move as the Tigers' defence rushed up too early. Walsh bust through the line and with only the fullback to beat and passed the ball to Huddart who raced 30 yards to score.

On the other side of half-time Billy Smith sliced through and found Johnny Raper who got to the Balmain 25-yard line before finding prop Kevin Ryan in support. It was a spectacular run from the evergreen forward who out-raced his pursuers and dived through the air to score and put the match beyond doubt.

Balmain had tried to slow down the Dragons with stifling tactics but this backfired and resulted in an unfavourable penalty count. Classy Dragons  Graeme Langlands capitalised on this, kicking seven goals.

Huddart was dominant for the clinical Saints who did not concede a try for a staggering seventh time in eight grand final victories. He had been niggled early in the game by the Balmain forwards and responded by running freely all match and crashing the Tigers with fiery tackles.

With the full-time siren St George had won their 11th successive Grand Final, setting a record that is unlikely to be ever broken in first grade rugby league or perhaps in any top-grade world team sport.

It was the last game played for the club by Dragons enforcer Kevin Ryan after seven Grand Final wins and also the farewell match for winger Eddie Lumsden who had appeared in nine of the victories.

St. George 23 (Tries: Pollard, Huddart, Ryan. Goals: Langlands 7.)

Balmain 4 (Goals: Barnes 2.)

Player statistics
The following statistics are as of the conclusion of Round 18.

Top 5 point scorers

Top 5 try scorers

Top 5 goal scorers

References

External links
 Writer, Larry (1995) Never Before, Never Again, Pan MacMillan, Sydney
 Rugby League Tables - Season 1966 The World of Rugby League
Results:1961-70 at rabbitohs.com.au
1966 J J Giltinan Shield and WD & HO Wills Cup at rleague.com
NSWRFL season 1966 at rugbyleagueproject.org
St. George 1966 season at showroom.com.au

New South Wales Rugby League premiership
Nswrfl season